Edwin Linton (1855–1939) was an American biologist noted for his research in the field of helminthology, the study of worms, especially parasitic worms in fishes.
Linton was Research Fellow in Biology at University of Pennsylvania and professor emeritus at Washington and Jefferson College.
The New York Times called Linton "one of the world's leading authorities on helminthology".
Linton received his doctorate from Yale University. He was awarded the 1937 Leidy Award from the Academy of Natural Sciences of Philadelphia.

References 

1855 births
1939 deaths
Washington & Jefferson College faculty
Yale University alumni
University of Pennsylvania faculty
American biologists